Sreeram Ramachandran is an Indian actor who works in Malayalam films , TV series, short films , music albums and web series

Career
Sreeram made his movie debut in 2010 through Malarvadi Arts Club directed by Vineeth Sreenivasan. His second collaboration with Vineeth was Thattathin Marayathu (2012). He played the lead role in the sitcom Chumma, telecast on Amrita TV. In 2013, he acted as the second lead in Artist, alongside Fahadh Faasil and Ann Augustine. He played the lead character Jeeva in the TV series Kasthooriman on Asianet.

Early life 

Sreeram Ramachandran was born in Kozhikode, Kerala. His father, Palai C. K. Ramachandran is an accomplished senior Carnatic musician and also the primary disciple of Sri Semmangudi Srinivasa Iyer. During his post-college days he was selected by Vineeth Sreenivasan to play a small role in his directorial debut Malarvadi Arts Club and later in Thattathin Marayathu. His brother Jayaram Ramachandran is a graphics designer and animator in the film industry. He did his schooling from Chinmaya Vidyalaya Kozhikode and pursued engineering from AWH Engineering College, Kozhikode.

Awards and nominations

Filmography

Films

Television serials

Other works

References

External links 

Indian male film actors
1986 births
Living people
Male actors from Kozhikode
21st-century Indian male actors
Male actors in Malayalam cinema
Indian male television actors
Male actors in Malayalam television